Zhang Xiuyun (born 25 February 1976) is a female Chinese rower. She competed for Team China at the 2008 Summer Olympics.

Records
 1993 National Games/Asian Championships – 1st single sculls;
 1993/1994 World Championships – 1st/2nd quadruple sculls;
 1995 National Champions Tournament – 1st 10000 m single sculls;
 1996 Olympic Games – 2nd double sculls;
 2000 National Championships – 1st single sculls;
 2003 World Championships – 5th single sculls

References

General references

1976 births
Living people
Chinese female rowers
Olympic rowers of China
Rowers at the 1996 Summer Olympics
Rowers at the 2008 Summer Olympics
Rowers at the 2012 Summer Olympics
Olympic medalists in rowing
Asian Games medalists in rowing
Rowers at the 1998 Asian Games
Rowers at the 2002 Asian Games
World Rowing Championships medalists for China
Medalists at the 1996 Summer Olympics
Olympic silver medalists for China
Asian Games gold medalists for China
Medalists at the 1998 Asian Games
Medalists at the 2002 Asian Games
20th-century Chinese women
21st-century Chinese women